Signosomopsis is a genus of parasitic flies in the family Tachinidae. There are at least three described species in Signosomopsis.

Species
These three species belong to the genus Signosomopsis:
 Signosomopsis argentea Townsend, 1914
 Signosomopsis eronis Curran
 Signosomopsis townsendi Curran, 1929

References

Further reading

 
 
 
 

Tachinidae
Articles created by Qbugbot